A personal protection officer (PPO) is an officer of the Metropolitan Police Protection Command who is assigned for the personal protection of members of the British royal family, the prime minister, government ministers, ambassadors, visiting heads of state, and other individuals deemed to be at risk.

Prior to a restructuring of the Metropolitan Police's armed protection commands between 2015 and 2017, protection of the royal family and protection of senior Government officials and diplomats was carried out by two separate commands, with PPOs assigned to individual royals for long periods and able to build up a close professional relationship. Following the merger of royal and diplomatic protection, individual PPOs rotate through a pool and may protect different individuals on different days.

Incidents 
During the 2017 Westminster attack, an unnamed PPO providing protection to then Secretary of State for Defence Michael Fallon shot and killed the attacker Khalid Masood.

References 

Metropolitan Police
Positions within the British Royal Household
Law enforcement occupations in the United Kingdom